The 1993 Seattle Mariners season was their 17th since the franchise creation. It was the franchise's first full season under the ownership of Hiroshi Yamauchi. During the 1993 season, Randy Johnson set a club record with 308 strikeouts. It was also the first season he walked less than 100 batters.

The previous fall, the team also introduced a new logo, team colors and uniform set for this season that remain the team's current look to this day (with slight adjustments made in 2015).

Offseason
October 5, 1992: John Moses was released by the Seattle Mariners.
 October 14, 1992: The Mariners dismissed manager Bill Plummer, along with the entire coaching staff.
 November 10, 1992: The Mariners hire Lou Piniella as the team's new manager.
 November 17, 1992: Kevin Mitchell was traded by the Seattle Mariners to the Cincinnati Reds for Norm Charlton.
 November 28, 1992: David Ortiz was signed by the Seattle Mariners as an amateur free agent.
December 23, 1992: Mackey Sasser was signed as a free agent with the Seattle Mariners.
February 2, 1993: Henry Cotto was signed as a free agent with the Seattle Mariners.
 March 16, 1993: Mike Schooler was released by the Seattle Mariners.

Regular season

Season standings

Record vs. opponents

Notable transactions
May 14, 1993: Randy St. Claire was signed as a free agent with the Mariners.
 June 3, 1993: Alex Rodriguez was drafted by the Mariners with the first overall pick of the 1993 amateur draft. Player signed August 30, 1993.
 June 3, 1993: Matt Wise was drafted by the Seattle Mariners in the 54th round of the 1993 amateur draft, but did not sign. 
June 27, 1993: Dale Sveum was signed as a free agent.
June 27, 1993: Henry Cotto was traded with Jeff Darwin to the Florida Marlins for Dave Magadan.
July 21, 1993: Pete O'Brien was released to make room on the roster for Edgar Martínez.
August 5, 1993: Randy St. Claire was released by the Mariners.

Roster

Player stats

Batting

Starters by position 
Note: Pos = Position; G = Games played; AB = At bats; H = Hits; Avg. = Batting average; HR = Home runs; RBI = Runs batted in

Other batters 
Note: G = Games played; AB = At bats; H = Hits; Avg. = Batting average; HR = Home runs; RBI = Runs batted in

Pitching

Starting pitchers 
Note: G = Games pitched; IP = Innings pitched; W = Wins; L = Losses; ERA = Earned run average; SO = Strikeouts

Other pitchers 
Note: G = Games pitched; IP = Innings pitched; W = Wins; L = Losses; ERA = Earned run average; SO = Strikeouts

Relief pitchers 
Note: G = Games pitched; W = Wins; L = Losses; SV = Saves; ERA = Earned run average; SO = Strikeouts

Awards and honors
 Randy Johnson, American League leader, Strikeouts
 Randy Johnson, Franchise Record, Most Strikeouts in one season

Farm system

References

External links
1993 Seattle Mariners at Baseball Reference
1993 Seattle Mariners team page at www.baseball-almanac.com

Seattle Mariners seasons
Seattle Mariners season
Seattle Marin